Jay Glaser (born July 11, 1953) is an American competitive sailor and Olympic silver medalist. He was born in Santa Monica, California.

Career
At the 1984 Summer Olympics, Glaser finished in 2nd place in the Tornado class along with his partner, Randy Smyth.

References

External links
 
 
 

1953 births
American male sailors (sport)
Sailors at the 1984 Summer Olympics – Tornado
Olympic silver medalists for the United States in sailing
Living people
Sportspeople from Santa Monica, California
Medalists at the 1984 Summer Olympics
Tornado class world champions
World champions in sailing for the United States